Annavru is a 2003 Indian Kannada-language crime drama film directed by Om Prakash Rao for producer M.C. Dyanand, starring Ambareesh and Darshan with Kaniha, Suhasini and Sumihtra in supporting roles. The film is a remake of Mani Ratnam's Tamil film Thalapathi. The film released to positive reviews and was a box office success.

Plot 
On the day of the Bhogi festival, fourteen-year-old Kalyani gives birth to a boy alone and, fearing societal backlash and incapacity, abandons him inside a moving goods train. A slum dweller finds the baby, takes him home, names him Surya and raises him. The child grows up to be intolerant of injustice, especially to the poor, and wonders why his biological mother abandoned him. The only item from his mother is the yellow shawl in which she had placed him. Devaraj, a powerful gangster, who is kind but feared by most, fights injustice with violence. Surya attacks and kills Ramana, an auxiliary of Devaraj. Surya is arrested for murder and faces brutal torture from police, but Devaraj bails him out after perceiving Ramana's felony and realises Surya's cause was genuine. Surya and Devaraj, who share an ideology, come to understand each other. Devaraj declares Surya as his Thalapathi (commander) and best friend.

Arjun, the city's new district collector, wants to lawfully end violence. He is the second son of Kalyani, who is now a doctor. After abandoning Surya, her firstborn, she married Krishnamoorthy. Kalyani never told Arjun of the ordeal she faced as a teenager but is constantly grieved by thoughts of her long-lost firstborn. Meanwhile, Surya is courted by a Brahmin girl Subbulaxmi, who is smitten with his transparent nature. Surya's appraisal to Devaraj leads local people in the locality to respect them both. They continue objecting to societal incongruities. While Devaraj leads Surya to help curb unlawful discrepancies, Subbulaxmi despises Surya's use of violence and tries to persuade him against it. Devaraj tries to form a relationship between Subbulaxmi and Surya but Subbulaxmi's orthodox father objects and arranges her marriage to Arjun.

In his fight against organised crime, Arjun unsuccessfully targets Devaraj and Surya. Meanwhile, Padma, Ramana's widow, makes Surya feel guilty for killing Ramana. Understanding Padma's pain, Devaraj shelters her and her child. However, Padma confesses she is constantly troubled by the dishonourable men surrounding her. Devaraj, considering Padma and her daughter's safety and Surya's future, asks them to marry each other. Guilt-ridden, Surya marries Padma and eventually wins her child's affection. Later, at a medical camp, Kalyani meets Padma and her daughter, along with the shawl in which she wrapped Surya. After asking about the day he was found, Kalyani and Krishnamoorthy discover Surya is Kalyani's long-lost son during a suspect identification. Krishnamoorthy secretly meets Surya and reveals the truth of his origin to him. Surya asks Krishnamoorthy to promise not to let his mother know of Surya's identity because it would hurt her to know her son has grown to be a vigilante.

Kalyani eventually finds Surya and meets him. Surya vows not to harm Arjun for her sake. The long-standing feud between Devaraj and his main rival Kalivardhan makes Surya tell Devaraj, who learns of his meeting with his stepfather and mother the truth about his family. Devaraj is pleased to know that, despite Arjun being Surya's half-brother, Surya still sides with him, thus valuing their friendship over family. Because of this, Devaraj decides to surrender. Devaraj and Surya meet Arjun, who now knows Surya is his own half-brother. Suddenly, Kalivardhan's henchmen open fire and Devaraj is killed. Enraged, Surya storms into Kalivardhan's house, murders Kalivardhan and all of his henchmen, and surrenders to the police, but is exonerated due to lack of evidence. Arjun is later transferred to another state with Subbulaxmi while Kalyani stays with Surya.

Cast 
 Ambareesh
 Darshan as Surya
 Kaniha
 Sumithra
 Suhasini

Production 
Darshan and Ambareesh were to reprise Rajinikanth's and Mammootty's roles from the original, respectively. It is the Kannada debut of Kaniha. The film was initially titled Dalapati but it was later changed to Annavru to please Ambareesh's fans. Ambareesh was against the name change because Annavru was used to refer to Dr. Rajkumar, but the makers of the film were insistent to not change the film back to its old title. He was also unsure if the film would complete shooting due to an incident which took place during the film's shooting.

Soundtrack 
Soundtrack was composed by Rajesh Ramanath. Lyrics by K. Kalyan.

Release 
The film was scheduled to release on the same day as Bisi Bisi, Gokarna and Swathi Muthu. The film was a box office success.

References

External links 
 

2000s buddy films
2000s crime action films
2000s Kannada-language films
2000s masala films
2003 action drama films
2003 crime drama films
2003 films
Indian action drama films
Indian buddy drama films
Indian crime action films
Indian crime drama films
Indian gangster films
Kannada remakes of Tamil films